Petr Procházka (born March 26, 1964 in Hradec Králové) is a Czechoslovak-Czech sprint canoeist who competed from 1982 to 2006.

World junior champion in Belgrade in 1982, Procházka missed the 1984 Olympics because of the Eastern Bloc's boycott but went on to win two medals at the 1987 senior World Championships in Duisburg, West Germany. In the individual C-1 500 m he was the silver medallist. He also won a bronze medal in the C-2 500 m with partner Alan Lohniský. At the 1988 Summer Olympics however he came a disappointing eighth in the C-1 500 m and ninth in the C-2 500 m.

Ten years later, at an age when most canoeists are contemplating retirement, Procházka was embarking on a remarkable run of victories as a member of the Czech four-man C-4 200 m crew. He won a world championship gold medal in 1998, followed by four European titles (1999, 2000, 2001 and 2005). The 200 m, the shortest race distance, was ideal for Procházka, with his great physical strength and excellent technique more than compensating for a natural loss of stamina.

At the age of forty-two, the evergreen Procházka and the C-4 200 m crew finished in fourth place at the 2006 European Championships held in Račice (where he now lives) in the Czech Republic. They had lost their European crown, but a  month later they finally became world champions in Szeged, Hungary, an astonishing achievement for Procházka, the oldest competitor at the championships. Procházka would win a total of ten world championship medals in his career.

Nicknamed Čáp ("The Stork"), he is also still a member of the Czech Republic national Dragon boat squad. He is 175cmm (5'9") tall and weighs 85 kg (187 lbs).

References

Sports-reference.com profile

1964 births
Canoeists at the 1988 Summer Olympics
Canoeists at the 2000 Summer Olympics
Czech male canoeists
Czechoslovak male canoeists
Living people
Olympic canoeists of Czechoslovakia
Olympic canoeists of the Czech Republic
Sportspeople from Hradec Králové
ICF Canoe Sprint World Championships medalists in Canadian